Jewel Mary is an Indian actress and television presenter, who works in Malayalam films and television field.

Career
In school she performed in ballet, and in college she started working as a master of ceremonies, mostly for corporate events. In 2014, she began her career as a television presenter, co-hosting the reality show D 4 Dance on Mazhavil Manorama, alongside Govind Padmasoorya. Later she forayed into films, debuting with Pathemari. She has acted in several movies and hosted many reality TV shows and celebrity award nights across the globe.

Personal life
In April 2015, Jewel Mary married Jenson Zachariah, a television producer.

Filmography

Music Album

Television

Stage 
She has hosted several award nights a few of them are:
Asianet Comedy Awards (2015, 2016)
Asiavision Awards (2015)
Anand TV Film Awards (2016, 2017, 2018)
Vanitha Film Awards (2017)
Suvarna Hariharam (2017)
Asianet Film Awards (2018, 2020)

References

External links 
 

Living people
Actresses in Malayalam cinema
Actresses in Tamil cinema
Year of birth missing (living people)